Chalisgaon  is a city and a municipal council located in Jalgaon district in the state of Maharashtra, India.

Geography 
It has an average elevation of 344 metres (1128 feet).

Notable people 

 Hari Vinayak Pataskar (Politician and Law Minister and later on Public Aviation Minister from 1955 to 1957).

See also
Chalisgaon Railway Station
Chalisgaon - Dhule Railway Line
Dhule Terminus

References 

Cities and towns in Jalgaon district
Talukas in Maharashtra